Glen plaid (short for Glen Urquhart plaid), also known as Glenurquhart check or Prince of Wales check, is a woollen fabric with a woven twill design of small and large checks. It is usually made of black/grey and white, or with more muted colours, particularly with two dark and two light stripes alternate with four dark and four light stripes which creates a crossing pattern of irregular checks. Glen plaid as a woven pattern may be extended to cotton shirting and other non-woollen fabrics.

Name
The name is taken from the valley of Glenurquhart  in Inverness-shire, Scotland, where the checked wool was first used in the 19th century by the New Zealand-born Countess of Seafield to fit out her  gamekeepers, though the name Glen plaid does not appear before 1926.  Glen plaid is also known as the Prince of Wales check, as it was popularized by King Edward VIII when he was Prince of Wales.

In other words, despite its internationally known name (French prince de Galles, Spanish príncipe de Gales, Italian principe di Galles, etc.), the "Prince of Wales" fabric pattern is not a Welsh pattern but a Scottish one.

Notable wearers
Pee-wee Herman is famous for his light grey Glen plaid suit, and US President Ronald Reagan was considered "unpresidential" in a gray-and-blue Glen plaid suit on a European trip in 1982. Cary Grant wore an iconic grey Glen plaid suit in the 1959 American spy thriller film North By Northwest.

See also
Houndstooth
Tartan

References

Textile patterns
Scottish clothing